Shchetinin (Russian: Щетинин) was the first Russian aviation company. It was founded in St. Petersburg in 1910 under the name Pervoye Rossiyskoye Tovarishchestvo Vozdukhoplavaniya S. S. Shchetinin i Ko (First Russian Aeronautical Company S. S. Shchetinin and Co.). The company was led by the famous pilot S. S. Shchetinin and the lead designer was Dmitry Pavlovich Grigorovich. The company focused mainly on a series of flying boats, which initially were modeled after the American aircraft Curtiss Model K. A lengthy series of aircraft, starting with the designation letter "M" (Marine) followed. Famous aircraft were the M-5, M-9, M-11/M-12, M-15, M-16 and M-24/M-24bis.

Aircraft
See Grigorovich (design bureau) for a full list of aircraft.

Aircraft manufacturers of the Soviet Union